Francis Ronald Reiss (born November 11, 1940) is an American prelate of the Roman Catholic Church. He served as an auxiliary bishop of the Archdiocese of Detroit in Michigan from 2003 to 2015.

Biography

Early life 
Francis Reiss was born on November 11, 1940, in Hamtramck, Michigan, to Joseph and Emily Reiss. The oldest of the three children, he has a sister, Sandra, and brother, John. Reiss attended St. Stephen Elementary School and St. Andrew High School in Detroit.  He then entered Sacred Heart Seminary in Detroit, where he obtained a Bachelor of Philosophy degree in 1962. Reiss then studied at St. John Provincial Seminary in Plymouth. Michigan.

Priesthood 
Reiss was ordained to the priesthood for the Archdiocese of Detroit by Archbishop  John Dearden on June 4, 1966. He did his postgraduate studies at the University of Detroit, earning a Master of Religious Studies degree (1972) and a Master of Education degree (1973). He also received a Master of Divinity degree from St. John Provincial Seminary in 1974, and a Licentiate of Canon Law from the Pontifical Gregorian University in Rome in 1984.

Reiss served as campus minister at the University of Michigan and at Henry Ford Community College in Dearborn, Michigan.  He served later as dean of admissions and academic dean of the School of Theology at Sacred Heart Seminary. He also served as defender of the bond on Archdiocesan Metropolitan Tribunal, director of the Archdiocesan Department of Education, and archdiocesan vicar of the Southland Vicariate.

Reiss served as pastor of the following Michigan parishes:

 Holy Ghost in Detroit
 St. Mary in Port Huron 
 Ss. Peter and Paul in Detroit
 St. Frances Cabrini Parish in Allen Park

Auxiliary Bishop of Detroit 
On July 7, 2003, Pope John Paul II appointed Reiss as an auxiliary bishop of the Archdiocese of Detroit and titular bishop of Remesiana. He was consecrated on August 12, 2003, by Cardinal Adam Maida, with Cardinal Edmund Szoka and Walter Schoenherr serving as co-consecrators. Reiss selected as his episcopal motto: "In Christo Omnia" (Philippians 4:13).

On October 10, 2014, Reiss announced the removal of Reverend Thomas Belczakas as pastor of St. Kenneth Parish in Plymouth.  Reiss said that Thomas Belczakas and his brother, Reverend Edward Belczakas, stole $110,000 from St. Kenneth to help purchase a condominium in Palm Beach, Florida.

Reiss was diagnosed with esophageal cancer in 2008, but it has been in remission since 2009.

Retirement 
On November 11, 2015, Reiss submitted his letter of resignation as auxiliary bishop of the Archdiocese of Detroit, as required on his 75th birthday, and Pope Francis accepted it that day.

See also
 

 Catholic Church hierarchy
 Catholic Church in the United States
 Historical list of the Catholic bishops of the United States
 List of Catholic bishops of the United States
 Lists of patriarchs, archbishops, and bishops

References

External links
Roman Catholic Archdiocese of Detroit Official Site

Episcopal succession

1940 births
Living people
Pontifical Gregorian University alumni
Sacred Heart Major Seminary alumni
University of Detroit Mercy alumni
21st-century American Roman Catholic titular bishops
People from Hamtramck, Michigan
Roman Catholic Archdiocese of Detroit
University of Michigan people
Religious leaders from Michigan
Catholics from Michigan